The Don Pedro Dam, since 1971 also known as the Old Don Pedro Dam, was a dam across the Tuolumne River in Tuolumne County, California. The structure still exists and is flooded underneath Don Pedro Reservoir, which is formed by the New Don Pedro Dam.

Construction

It was completed in 1923 where the Tuolumne River had carved a narrow gorge with walls of solid rock about a mile (2 km) below Don Pedro Bar. The reservoir created by this dam contained  of water when full, 14.3% of today's capacity.

A 15 megawatt power plant was part of the dam's original design, and two more 7500 kilowatt generators were added in 1926 for 30 megawatts total, just 15% of today's capacity.

References

External links

Turlock Irrigation District
Modesto Irrigation District
USGS Hydrologic Data

Dams in California
Dams on the Tuolumne River
Former dams
Buildings and structures in Tuolumne County, California
Demolished buildings and structures in California
Hydroelectric power plants in California
Dams completed in 1924